Jamar may refer to the following:

People

Given name
Jamar Beasley (born 1979), American football player
Jamar Butler (born 1985), US basketball point guard
Jamar Chess (born 1980), US music publisher
Jamar Davis (born 1984), American streetball player
Jamar Diggs (born 1988), US professional basketball player
Jamar Fletcher (born 1979), American football player
Jamar Johnson (born 1999), American football player
Jamar Nesbit (born 1976), American football player
Jamar Samuels (born 1989), American basketball player
Jamar Summers (born 1995), American football player
Jamar Williams (born 1984), American football player

Surname
Alexandre Jamar, Belgian businessman, liberal politician and governor of the National Bank
Dieudonné Jamar, pro racing cyclist
Hervé Jamar, Belgian politician, liberal MR party
Jeff Jamar, FBI Special Agent in charge at the 1993 Waco siege
Kareem Jamar, US basketball player
Mark Jamar (nickname "Russian", born 1983), Australian rules football player

Pseudonym
Lord Jamar, stage name of Lorenzo Dechalus, US rapper and actor

Places 
Jamar, Gujarat, a village and former Rajput petty princely state on Saurashtra peninsula, western India
Jamar Jan, a village in Khvajehei Rural District, Meymand District, Firuzabad County, Iran